The Dallara Formulino is a series of open-wheel formula racing cars, designed, developed and built by Italian manufacturer Dallara, for the German ADAC Formel Masters spec-series, between 2008 and 2014.

References

Open wheel racing cars
Formulino